The Shellbend is a wooden folding boat, designed in the late 19th century by the Liverpool architect and civil engineer Mellard Treleaven Reade. It is constructed out of mahogany panels, which fold using canvas hinges to a fifth of the boat's original size. The intent was to create a lightweight collapsible boat, lighter than a solid-hull boat, to be used as a ship's tender.

Treleaven Reade's company, the Shellbend Folding Boat Company of Liverpool, offered the Shellbend from the late 1890s, though most of the boats were actually built by W. Roberts and Co. of Chester.

References 

Folding boats